Aotus (the name is derived from the Ancient Greek words for "earless" in both cases: the monkey is missing external ears, and the pea is missing earlike bracteoles) may refer to:
 Aotus (plant), one of the plant genera commonly known as golden peas in the family Fabaceae (bean family)
 Aotus (monkey), the genus of night monkeys in the family Aotidae
 AOTUS, the acronym for the Archivist of the United States